Labarrus is a genus of scarab beetles in the family Scarabaeidae. There are more than 20 described species in Labarrus, found worldwide.

Species
These 21 species belong to the genus Labarrus:

 Labarrus cincticulus Hope, 1847
 Labarrus digitatus (Harold, 1871)
 Labarrus evachromae (Chromý, 1993)
 Labarrus hoabinhensis (Balthasar, 1946)
 Labarrus innumerabilis (Schmidt, 1911)
 Labarrus kasyi (Petrovitz, 1965)
 Labarrus lividus (Olivier, 1789)
 Labarrus madagassicus (Petrovitz, 1961)
 Labarrus meruensis (Petrovitz, 1961)
 Labarrus nabeleki (Balthasar, 1936)
 Labarrus paludani (Petrovitz, 1955)
 Labarrus paralividus (Balthasar, 1941)
 Labarrus parnaguaensis (Petrovitz, 1961)
 Labarrus pseudolividus (Balthasar, 1941)
 Labarrus rigidus (Balthasar, 1936)
 Labarrus rugosicapita (Mittal, 1993)
 Labarrus splendidus (Petrovitz, 1955)
 Labarrus sublimbatus (Motschulsky, 1860)
 Labarrus translucidus (Petrovitz, 1961)
 Labarrus umbratus (Petrovitz, 1961)
 Labarrus witboii (Petrovitz, 1961)

References

Scarabaeidae genera
Taxa named by Étienne Mulsant